The 2015–16 season was the 56th season in the history of NK Maribor, and their 25th consecutive season in the Slovenian PrvaLiga since the league establishment in 1991. The team participated in the Slovenian PrvaLiga, Slovenian Football Cup, and UEFA Champions League. The season covers the period from 1 June 2015 to 31 May 2016.

Supercup

Colour key: Green = Maribor win; Yellow = draw; Red = opponents win.

Slovenian League

Standings

Results summary

Results by round

Matches

Colour key: Green = Maribor win; Yellow = draw; Red = opponents win.

Notes

Slovenian Cup

Colour key: Green = Maribor win; Yellow = draw; Red = opponents win.

UEFA Champions League

Second qualifying round

Colour key: Green = Maribor win; Yellow = draw; Red = opponents win.

Friendlies

Colour key: Green = Maribor win; Yellow = draw; Red = opponents win.

Squad statistics

Key
Players

No.     = Shirt number
Pos.    = Playing position
GK      = Goalkeeper
DF      = Defender
MF      = Midfielder
FW      = Forward

Nationality

 = Albania
 = Bosnia and Herzegovina
 = Brazil
 = France
 = Italy
 = Israel
 = Macedonia
 = Montenegro
 = Senegal
 = Slovenia

Competitions

 = Appearances
 = Goals
 = Yellow card
 = Red card

Designations

Appearances and goals
Correct as of 25 May 2016, match v. Celje. Flags indicate national team as has been defined under FIFA eligibility rules. Players may hold more than one non-FIFA nationality. The players squad numbers, playing positions, nationalities and statistics are based solely on match reports in Matches sections above and the official website of NK Maribor and the Slovenian PrvaLiga. Only the players, which made at least one appearance for the first team, are listed.

Discipline
Correct as of 25 May 2016, match v. Celje. Flags indicate national team as has been defined under FIFA eligibility rules. Players may hold more than one non-FIFA nationality. The players squad numbers, playing positions, nationalities and statistics are based solely on match reports in Matches sections above and the official website of NK Maribor and the Slovenian PrvaLiga. If a player received two yellow cards in a match and was subsequently sent off the numbers count as two yellow cards, one red card.

Foreign players
Below is the list of foreign players who have made appearances for the club during the 2015–16 season. Players primary citizenship is listed first.
EU Nationals

 Jean-Philippe Mendy
 Abel Gigli

EU Nationals (Dual citizenship)

  Valon Ahmedi
  Arghus
  Rodrigo Defendi
  Marcos Tavares
  Agim Ibraimi

Non-EU Nationals

 Amar Rahmanović
 Marwan Kabha
 Sintayehu Sallalich
 Marko Janković
 Welle N'Diaye

Transfers and loans

In

Out

Loans in

Loans out

See also
List of NK Maribor seasons

References

NK Maribor seasons
Maribor
Maribor